HMS Constance was a  light cruiser of the Royal Navy that saw service in World War I. She was part of the Cambrian group of the C class.

Construction
Constance was laid down on 25 January 1915, launched on 12 September 1915, and completed in January 1916.

Service history

World War I
Commissioned into service in the Royal Navy in January 1916, Constance was assigned to the 4th Light Cruiser Squadron of the Grand Fleet from her commissioning until 1919, taking part in the Battle of Jutland on 31 May-1 June 1916.

Postwar
After the conclusion of World War I, Constance was assigned to the 8th Light Cruiser Squadron on the North American and West Indies Station from 1919 to 1926, recommissioning at Devonport in January 1923 to continue this service. From September 1926 to December 1927, she underwent a refit at Chatham Dockyard, becoming the flagship of the Portsmouth Reserve upon its completion. She was assigned to the 5th Cruiser Squadron on the China Station from 1928 to November 1930.

In March 1931, Constance was decommissioned, transferred to the Reserve Fleet, and placed in reserve at Portsmouth, remaining in reserve there until July 1935.

Disposal
Constance was sold in January 1936 or on 8 June 1936 (sources differ) to Arnott Young, of Dalmuir, Scotland, to be scrapped.

Notes

References

External links 
Ships of the Cambrian class
 Battle of Jutland Crew Lists Project - HMS Constance Crew List

C-class cruisers
Ships built on the River Mersey
1915 ships
World War I cruisers of the United Kingdom